Gladys Davis (29 July 1893 – 23 May 1965) was a British fencer. She won a silver medal in the women's individual foil competition at the 1924 Summer Olympics.

References

External links
 

1893 births
1965 deaths
British female fencers
Olympic fencers of Great Britain
Fencers at the 1924 Summer Olympics
Olympic silver medallists for Great Britain
Olympic medalists in fencing
Medalists at the 1924 Summer Olympics